Pykrete is a frozen ice composite, originally made of approximately 14% sawdust or some other form of wood pulp (such as paper) and 86% ice by weight (6 to 1 by weight).  

During World War II, Geoffrey Pyke proposed it as a candidate material for a supersized aircraft carrier for the British Royal Navy. Pykrete features unusual properties, including a relatively slow melting rate due to its low thermal conductivity, as well as a vastly improved strength and toughness compared to ordinary ice. These physical properties can make the material comparable to concrete, as long as the material is kept frozen.

Pykrete is slightly more difficult to form than concrete, as it expands during the freezing process. However, it can be repaired and maintained using seawater as a raw material. The mixture can be moulded into any shape and frozen, and it will be tough and durable, as long as it is kept at or below freezing temperature.

History

During World War II
Geoffrey Pyke managed to convince Lord Mountbatten of the potential of his proposal (actually prior to the invention of pykrete) sometime around 1942, and trials were made at two locations in Alberta, Canada.  The idea for a ship made of ice impressed the United States and Canada enough that a -long, 1,000-ton ship was built in one month on Patricia Lake in the Canadian Rockies. However, it was constructed using plain ice (from the lake), before pykrete was proposed. It took slightly more than an entire summer to melt, but plain ice proved to be too weak. Pyke learned from a report by Herman Mark and his assistant that ice made from water mixed with wood fibres formed a strong solid mass—much stronger than pure water ice. Max Perutz later recalled:

Perutz would later learn that Project Habakkuk was the plan to build an enormous aircraft carrier, actually more of a floating island than a ship in the traditional sense. The experiments of Perutz and his collaborators in Smithfield Meat Market in the City of London took place in great secrecy behind a screen of animal carcasses.

Mountbatten’s reaction to the breakthrough is recorded by Pyke's biographer David Lampe:

Another tale is that at the Quebec Conference of 1943 Mountbatten brought a block of pykrete along to demonstrate its potential to the entourage of admirals and generals who had come along with Winston Churchill and Franklin D. Roosevelt.  Mountbatten entered the project meeting with two blocks and placed them on the ground. One was a normal ice block and the other was pykrete. He then drew his service pistol and shot at the first block. It shattered and splintered. Next, he fired at the pykrete to give an idea of the resistance of that kind of ice to projectiles.  The bullet ricocheted off the block, grazing the trouser leg of Admiral Ernest King and ending up in the wall. According to Perutz's own account, however, the incident of a ricochetting bullet hitting an Admiral actually happened much earlier in London and the gun was fired by someone on the project—not Mountbatten.

Despite these tests, the main Project Habakkuk was never put into action because of limitations in funds and the belief that the tides of the war were beginning to turn in favour of the Allies using more conventional methods.

According to the memoirs of British General Ismay:

After World War II

Since World War II, pykrete has remained a scientific curiosity, unexploited by research or construction of any significance. New concepts for pykrete however crop up occasionally among architects, engineers and futurists, usually regarding its potential for mammoth offshore construction or its improvement by applying super-strong materials such as synthetic composites or Kevlar.

In 1985, pykrete was considered for a quay in Oslo harbour. However, the idea was later shelved, considering pykrete's unreliability in the real-world environment. Since pykrete needs to be preserved at or below freezing point, and tends to sag under its own weight at temperatures above , an alternative was considered that would guarantee effectiveness and public safety.

They improved on an original Japanese technique of spraying ice on a balloon by using the natural properties of ice and its strength. This structure managed to stand for three months before sunlight started melting the ice, rendering the structure unreliable. Researcher Johann Kollegger of Vienna University of Technology thinks his team's alternative new method is easier, avoiding icy sprayback onto the workers. To build their freestanding structure, Kollegger and his colleagues first cut an  plate of ice into 16 segments. To sculpt the segments to have a dome-like curve, the researchers relied on ice's creep behavior. If pressure is applied to ice, it slowly changes its shape without breaking. One of the mechanisms by which glaciers move, called glacial creep, functions similarly, the researchers say.

In 2014, the Eindhoven University of Technology worked on a pykrete architecture project in Juuka, Finland, which included an ice dome and a pykrete scale model of the Sagrada Familia. They attempted to build the largest ice dome in the world. Due to human error, the plug to a compressor that kept the balloon inflated was pulled, leading to the balloon deflating. The team of Dutch students quickly re-inflated the balloon, and resprayed the part of the dome that had collapsed. They continued with their construction, and eventually opened the dome to the public. However within a matter of days the roof caved in; there were no visitors on the site at the time.

Mechanical properties
The durability of pykrete is still debated.

A September 1943 proposal for making smaller pykrete vessels included the following table of characteristics:

In the media
In 2009, the Discovery Channel program MythBusters episode 115 tested the properties of pykrete and the myths behind it. First, the program's primary hosts, Adam Savage and Jamie Hyneman, compared the mechanical properties of common ice, pykrete, and a new material specially created for the show, dubbed "super pykrete", which used newspapers instead of woodpulp. Both versions of pykrete indeed proved to be much stronger than the chunk of ice, withstanding hundreds of pounds of weight. The super pykrete was much stronger than the original version.

The MythBusters then built a full-size boat out of the super pykrete, naming it Yesterday's News, and subjected it to real-world conditions. The MythBusters vessel did not contain refrigeration units to keep the pykrete frozen as the original plans called for, and the boat had a much thinner construction than the massive ships proposed in World War II. After 20 minutes the boat was deteriorating, and the experiment was ended. The boat lasted another 10 minutes while being piloted back to shore. Though the boat worked, it was noted that it would be highly impractical for the original proposal, which claimed that an entire aircraft carrier could be built out of pykrete. Their conclusion was "Plausible, but ludicrous", since it would involve building vessels out of tens of thousands of tons of the material that would sink without being kept cool.

All four presenters, Jem Stansfield, Dallas Campbell, Liz Bonnin, and Yan Wong, had to be rescued from Portsmouth Harbour after the boat took on water through the engine mounts. It eventually capsized after melting much faster than anticipated in the warmer-than-expected September waters.

2013 German TV station WDR's programme Kopfball experimented with pykrete but exchanged the woodpulp with hemp-fibres. A 5 cm thick plate withstood even more than 80 kg without breaking, it only started to bend.

Neal Stephenson's 2015 novel Seveneves describes the fictional use of pykrete to construct low Earth orbit habitats and space ship hulls.

99% Invisible's 3rd volume of mini-stories podcasts includes an article about Project Habbakuk and the creation, proposal, and eventual scrapping of pykrete as a useful building material during WWII.

Science & Futurism with Isaac Arthur Youtube episode "Colonizing Ceres" describes the fictional use of pykrete to construct a dome habitat on an asteroid to be mined.

See also 
 Cement-bonded wood fiber
 Ground freezing, a construction technique using similar properties of frozen soil
 Project Habbakuk

Footnotes

References

External links
 Pykrete - Ice Ships in the Rockies
 Proposed WW2 aircraft carrier 
 Pykrete ... or, The Myth that Wouldn't Die...
http://pykreteusa.com/

Composite materials
Recycled building materials
Concrete
Water ice